Robison Peak is a snow-covered peak (2,230 m) standing 3 nautical miles (6 km) northeast of Mount Dearborn, near the north end of the Willett Range, Victoria Land. It was named by the Advisory Committee on Antarctic Names (US-ACAN) for Leslie B. Robison, a United States Geological Survey (USGS) civil engineer who surveyed the peak in December 1960.

Mountains of Victoria Land
Scott Coast
Willett Range